Hum Tumhare Hain Sanam is a 2002 Hindi-language romantic drama film directed by K. S. Adhiyaman (his Hindi debut). The film stars Shah Rukh Khan, Madhuri Dixit and Salman Khan, with Aishwarya Rai in a cameo appearance.

Hum Tumhare Hain Sanam took five years to make, with huge sabbaticals between shoots due to production problems. The film is a remake of 1995 Tamil movie Thotta Chinungi directed by Adhiyaman himself.The film was produced by K. C. Bokadia. The rights of the film is owned by Shah Rukh Khan's Red Chillies Entertainment.

Plot
Dev Narayan lives with his daughter Laxmi and her children, Radha and Prashant. He also looks after two orphans, Gopal and Nita. When he refuses to pay for Laxmi's husband Ramnath who must be operated, she leaves with her children. Ramnath dies. Laxmi spots and takes in an orphaned boy. Radha forms a sisterly bond with him, named Suraj.

23 years later
Suraj, now a famous and popular singer is grateful to Radha for contributing to his success by her support. Gopal is a rich businessman. Laxmi dies in an accident. Radha and Prashant shift to Dev's house. As Gopal loves Radha, Dev gets them married. Gopal frequently spots Radha spending much time with Suraj on call and thus suspects them to be in an affair. However, later, he realizes he misunderstood their sibling relationship for adultery. Gopal thus unites with Radha and apologizes to Suraj, who also has his own girlfriend Suman. All live happy thereafter.

Cast
Salman Khan as Suraj
Shahrukh Khan as Gopal, Radha’s husband.
Madhuri Dixit as Radha, Gopal’s wife.
Aishwarya Rai as Suman, Suraj’s girlfriend. (cameo appearance)
Alok Nath as Dev Narayan 
Aruna Irani as Laxmi, Radha’s and Prashant’s mother.
Atul Agnihotri as Prashant, Radha’s brother.
Suman Ranganathan as Nita, Gopal’s sister.
Laxmikant Berde as Hasmukh
Vikas Anand as Ramu
Asha Sharma as Mohana
Dinesh Hingoo as Lawyer
Payal Malhotra

Production
Production was first reported in February 1996 when it was revealed that producer K. C. Bokadia had signed on K. S. Adhiyaman to remake his successful Tamil film Thotta Chinungi (1995) into Hindi. Initially, it was revealed that Aamir Khan, Juhi Chawla and Sunny Deol were to play the three lead roles, though there ended up being a total change of cast, with Shah Rukh Khan, Madhuri Dixit and Salman Khan replacing them.

Soundtrack

The music was composed by Nadeem-Shravan, Nikhil-Vinay, Daboo Malik, Bappi Lahiri, Bali Brahmabhatt, and Sajid–Wajid. Lyrics were penned by Sameer, Praveen Bhardwaj, Maya Govind, Kartik Avasthi, and Jalees Sherwani. The background score was composed by Uttam Singh. According to the Indian trade website Box Office India, with around 20,00,000 units sold, this film's soundtrack album was the year's fifth highest-selling. The tune of the title song 'Hum Tumhare Hain Sanam' was copied from Pakistani singer Hadiqa Kiani's 1998 song "Boohe Baariyaan".

Track listing

Critical reception
Variety wrote that "Despite a cast that "reunites" some of Hindi cinema's biggest names, the long-awaited Hum Tumhare Hain Sanam which finally premiered in late May, reps a major disappointment, of interest offshore only to Bollywood historians". Empire Online noted that "Love triangles are a common device in Bollywood flicks, and sadly, Hum Tumhare Hain Sanam has nothing new to offer." A critic from Radio Times stated that "Nuance isn't a Bollywood speciality, and there's little in the way of subtle shading here but, with its impressive all-star cast and songs from some of India's leading composers, this enjoyable melodrama can't be beaten for big, bold emotion". The Times of India wrote that "The film is a ready reckoner for everything that should be avoided in a good film".

Reviewer Anita Bora writes "A medium-sized dose of love with a big dash of suspicion. Add to it several scoops of friendship. Towards the end, add a few drops of humor". She even says that "The premise of the film is simple. Jealousy. If you discount the fact the 'falling in love' was instant (but when is it not?), the topic is quite interesting. Haven't we all at some point read too much into situations, overreacted, undergone pangs of jealousy that seem downright silly later?"

Box office 

India

It opened on Friday, 24 May 2002, across 300 screens, and earned  nett on its opening day. It grossed  nett in its opening weekend, and had a first week of  nett. The film earned a total of  nett, and was declared an Average at the box office.

Overseas

It had an opening weekend of $875,000 (4.28 crore) and went on to gross $1.215 million (5.95 crore) in its first week. The film earned a total of $2.55 million (12.49 crore)

References

External links
 

Films scored by Nikhil-Vinay
Films scored by Daboo Malik
Films scored by Sajid–Wajid
Films scored by Bappi Lahiri
2000s Hindi-language films
2002 films
Films scored by Nadeem–Shravan
Hindi remakes of Tamil films
Indian romantic drama films
2002 romantic drama films
Films directed by K. S. Adhiyaman